Harold Stanley Kalms, Baron Kalms (born 21 November 1931) is the life president and former chairman of Currys plc (formerly DSG International plc, Dixons Group, Dixons Carphone). Currys plc owns Currys, as well as the now phased-out brands "PC World", "Team Knowhow" (in-house services) and various international electronics retailers. Dixons Retail merged with Carphone Warehouse in October 2014 to become Dixons Carphone (later Currys plc).  He spent his entire career from 1948 working for Dixons, which was founded by his father Charles Kalms in 1937.

He was Chairman of Volvere plc, a British turnaround group, from 2002 – 2011.

Background 
Stanley Kalms was educated at Christ's College, Finchley. He married Pamela Jimack in 1954. They have three sons (Richard, Stephen and Paul) and eight grandchildren.

Career
Kalms joined Dixons in 1948 at the age of 16 and over the years grew the company from a one-store family business into Europe's leading specialist electrical retailer. Kalms was appointed Chairman of the Dixons Group plc in 1971. He was also a Governor of Dixons City Academy in Bradford, West Yorkshire (where an art theatre complex is named in his honour), a Director of Business for Sterling, and a Director of the National Institute of Economic and Social Research.

Charitable activities

Kalms is also involved in many private charitable activities including the setting up of the Stanley Kalms Foundation in London and previously the Stanley Kalms Readership in Business Ethics and Strategic Management at University of North London. He was Chairman of King's Healthcare NHS Trust from 1993 to 1996. He was also involved in the King's Hospital ISLET Diabetes Research Programme.

Publications  
Kalms has written in the press on the subjects of European Monetary Union (EMU), and on Corporate Governance; and a book – A Time to Change – a review of the activities of the United Synagogue (1996).

Politics
Kalms was treasurer of the Conservative Party, 2001–3. Like many in the party, he opposed the euro.  Kalms, who is Jewish, attacked William Hague for his position on the Israel attack in Lebanon, calling him an "ignorant armchair critic" and that remarks were "downright dangerous". He was expelled from the party in 2009 after voting for UKIP and is currently non-affiliated.

He was the Director of the Centre for Policy Studies (CPS) think tank from 1991 to 2001.
He is a member of the Advisory Board of United Against Nuclear Iran which is an advocacy organization closely tied to neoconservative and other “pro-Israel” factions that promotes a confrontational U.S. stance towards Iran, particularly with respect to its nuclear program.
Kalms is a member of the Savile Club and Portland Club. The Stanley Kalms Foundation gave £100,000 to the neoconservative Henry Jackson Society in 2013.

Honours
Kalms has close connections to the University of Buckingham.  He received an honorary degree from Buckingham, and Chris Woodhead was the Sir Stanley Kalms Professor of Education. He received his knighthood in the 1996 New Years Honours for his services to the electrical retailing industry and made a life peer as Baron Kalms, of Edgware in the London Borough of Barnet in 2004.

Further reading
 KALMS, Sir (Harold) Stanley International Who's Who. accessed September 4, 2006.

References

External links

1931 births
British businesspeople in retailing
British Eurosceptics
British Jews
Conservative Party (UK) life peers
English businesspeople
Jewish British politicians
Knights Bachelor
Life peers
Living people
People associated with the University of Buckingham
People educated at Christ's College, Finchley
Life peers created by Elizabeth II